Clubland is a brand created by the UK dance record labels All Around the World and Universal Music TV. Since 2002 Clubland has made many dance compilation albums, including the popular Clubland series, which is currently up to Volume 28, which was released on 13 November 2015. Clubland also hosts live events in various nightclubs and clubland Ibiza, and in 2008 many Clubland artists featured on the Clubland Night of Your Life arena tour. In January 2008, Clubland launched its own digital TV channel, Clubland TV.

Since 2019, Clubland has stopped releasing new compilation albums, instead focusing on events that tour the United Kingdom, and Clubland TV continues to be run by Universal Music TV, playing mostly Throwback Dance from the early 1990s to the late 2010s.

Website
The Clubland Website, www.clubland.fm, featured various content such as music, videos, mixes, downloads, games, live chat, and so much more. You could access all the latest information about albums, upcoming events, live performances and more. It also contained a Clubland shop in which you could buy various official Clubland merchandise such as t-shirts. The Clubland website no longer exists, and instead, has been put into the hands of the 'All Around the World' website (www.aatw.com) where you can see the latest information about Clubland albums, and other music by All Around the World.

Radio Show Podcasts
Since October 2006, each month there had been a podcast released by Clubland, available for listeners to download from their website  or iTunes . Dave Bethell presented the podcast, which was usually about 30 minutes long, in the same style as a radio show and the podcast was also used mainly to air exclusive new Clubland tracks and advertise forthcoming Clubland releases and events. Podcasts are now unavailable.

Clubland TV

In January 2008, Clubland launched its own TV channel on Sky channel 383. The channel airs the latest Clubland music videos as well as Clubland classics. In the future the channel will show live events and interviews from Clubland as well as competitions and prizes. The channel is now on Virgin TV channel 345 and Freeview channel 80.

Live Events
Clubland often hold live events across various nightclubs in UK, Ireland and across Europe. Flip & Fill, Ultrabeat and Micky Modelle usually tour nightclubs with MC Keyes and sometimes a Live PA act. Launch parties are held around the time of a new Clubland or Clubland X-Treme Hardcore release, with live performances by Clubland artists, such as Flip & Fill and Ultrabeat, and these are used to help promote the release and filming for the album trailers.

On their website, Clubland usually promote the weekend events of some of their favorite venues and some of the hardcore events taking place, as well as promoting the live performances of some of their artists. Clubland also promoted Cascada's UK tour with Ultrabeat in September – October 2007.

Clubland Live
In March 2008, Clubland held  Clubland Live, an arena tour across seven arenas in the UK with some of the biggest acts in Clubland appearing. Cascada and Scooter headlined the tour and some of the acts appearing on the tour were Ultrabeat, Flip & Fill, Kelly Llorenna and Karen Parry.

Clubland Live 2
A second tour followed in November and December 2008, this time with Scooter headlined headlining and acts including September, Kate Ryan, Darren Styles, Ultrabeat, Flip & Fill and Karen Parry.

Clubland Live 3
In July 2009, Clubland's website revealed the dates for Clubland Live 3 with Cascada headlining the show. Other performers include Agnes Carlsson (aka Agnes), N-Dubz, Darren Styles, Ultrabeat and Flip & Fill. The shows started on 26 Nov. at the Glasgow SECC Arena and ended on 6 December at The National Indoor Arena, Birmingham.

Clubland Live 4
The Clubland Live 4 tour was scheduled to take place in October 2010 at various locations across the country. Headlined by Scooter headlined and other acts including Tinchy Stryder, Alex K, Ultrabeat, Flip & Fill and ItaloBrothers. The entire tour was cancelled on 6 October 2010 due to 'unforeseen circumstances' , after an announcement on the official Clubland website. No further information was given.

Performers

Compilation albums

Clubland series

Clubland X-Treme Hardcore series

Floorfillers series
Floorfillers
 Floorfillers 2
 Floorfillers 3
 Floorfillers 4
 Floorfillers Club Classics
 Floorfillers Anthems
 Floorfillers 08
 Floorfillers Clubmix
 Floorfillers 80's Club Classics
 Floorfillers 2010
 Monster Floorfillers
 Floorfillers 2011
 Floorfillers Party Mix
 Ultimate Floorfillers
 Floorfillers Old Skool
 Floorfillers Club Anthems

Dance Mania series
Dance Mania
 Dance Mania 2
 Dance Mania Party (CD/DVD) – Released 8 December 2008

Ultimate NRG series (Mixed By Alex K)
Ultimate NRG
Ultimate NRG 2
 Ultimate NRG 3
 Ultimate NRG 4
 Ultimate NRG Megamix
 Ultimate NRG 5

Clubmix series
 Clubmix 2003
 Clubmix 2004
 Clubmix 2005
 Clubmix 2006
 Clubmix 2007
 Clubmix Classics

Others
 Anthem – Classics from Clubland
 Funky House '06
 Club 2K7
 Dancemix 2008
 Bounce Mania
 Welcome to the Club
 RnB Clubland
 Clubland Classix – The Album of Your Life
 Clubland Classix 2 – The Album of Your Life is Back
 Clubland Smashed [Mixed By Friday Night Posse & Tuffcub]
 Clubland Smashed 2 [Mixed By Friday Night Posse & Tuffcub]

References

External links
AATW.com
Clubland Events MySpace
ClublandFM's Channel on YouTube

Compilation album series
Privately held companies of the United Kingdom